Ipswitch IMail Server is an email server application with groupware functionality that runs on Microsoft Windows OS.  It was developed in 1994 by Ipswitch, Inc., a software company based in Lexington, Massachusetts.

Features
	
Ipswitch IMail Server is a Windows email server that includes the following services: Webmail, SMTP, POP3, IMAP, LDAP, and List Server.  Additional features include collaboration for Outlook data, Commtouch anti-spam, anti-virus protection powered by BitDefender, email archiving, instant messaging and solutions for installing IMail on a hosted server.  IMail Server licenses are available in packages for 10, 25, 100, 250, 500, 1000, 2500 and unlimited number of users.

Supported Clients
	
Any standards-based client including Microsoft Outlook, Outlook Express, Mozilla Thunderbird, Eudora,
	
IMail Server’s web client, and all mobile devices supported by Microsoft Exchange ActiveSync including the iPhone.

Technical Specs
IMail can handle as many as 300,000 users, with an average message flow of ~25 per second / ~2 million a day.

Support for 32 and 64 bit platforms. IIS/.Net Framework 3.5 SMTP, POP3, IMAP4, and LDAP Protocol Support RFC 1870 Compliant

Support for PCI DSS & HIPAA compliance.

Release history
 In 1994, Ipswitch begins selling IMail Server, the first software product available for sale and immediate download via Open Market.
 In 1995, Ipswitch releases family of Windows NT Internet Servers
 In 1996, Ipswitch announces the first self-monitoring email server for Windows
 In 1997, Ipswitch announces IMail Server 4.0 - the first email server to protect users from Spam
 In 1998, Ipswitch's IMail Server is first to bundle Web Messaging and E-Mail-to-Pager with IMail Server version 4.0 for WindowsNT
 In 1999, Ipswitch unveils IMail Server 6.0 for Windows NT
 In 2001, Ipswitch, Inc. Unveils All-In-One Anti-Virus Messaging Solution
 In 2003, Ipswitch announces release of IMail Server 8.0
 In 2003, Ipswitch enters corporate instant messaging market with release of Ipswitch Instant Messenger
 In 2004, Ipswitch expands IMail Server anti-spam offering
 In 2005, Ipswitch launches Ipswitch IMail Server, Secure Edition
 In 2006, Ipswitch announces worldwide availability of IMail Server Plus 2006.1
 In 2007, Ipswitch announces availability of IMail Server 2006.2 with enterprise-level anti-spam and additional anti-virus from BitDefender
 In 2008, Ipswitch Messaging announces release of IMail Server Version 10
 In 2008, Ipswitch Messaging announces two new email archival solutions for IMail Server - MailArchiva Enterprise Edition and Sonian Hosted Archival System
 In 2008, Ipswitch Messaging introduces IMail Server v10.02 with newly integrated Commtouch Anti-Spam and Reputation service
 In 2009, Ipswitch Messaging announces release of IMail Server v11 with mobile synchronization capabilities
 In 2009, Ipswitch Messaging announces release of IMail Server v11.01 featuring DomainKeys and DKIM
 In 2010, Ipswitch Messaging announces release of IMail Server v11.02 featuring new administrator capabilities
 In 2010, Ipswitch Messaging announces release of IMail Server v11.03 featuring availability of Zero Hour Virus Outbreak Protection
 In 2019, Progress Software purchases Ipswitch.
 In 2019, Progress Software releases IMail v12.5.8

Message transfer agents
Windows Internet software